"These Are My People" is a song written by Dave Berg and Rivers Rutherford, and recorded by American country music artist Rodney Atkins. It was released in March 2007 as the third single from his platinum album If You're Going Through Hell, as well as the third straight Number One single from that album.

Content
The song is an up-tempo which is introduced by a fiddle solo, with guitar also accompanying. The lyrics are the narrator's description of his rural lifestyle: specifically, the friends with whom he plays church league softball and drinks beer at a bar. The first verse references three Lynyrd Skynyrd songs: "Gimme Three Steps", "Simple Man", and "The Ballad of Curtis Loew". "Lovin' and laughin' and bustin' our asses", a line from the first verse, was changed to "…bustin' our backs" in the radio edit.

Critical reception
J. Poet of Allmusic described the song favorably, saying that "It's a string of clichés, the kind of song that can sink under its own sentimental weight, but Atkins delivers it with a sly humor that makes it believable."

Music video
The music video was directed by Eric Welch and premiered in early 2007.

Chart performance
"These Are My People" debuted at number 57 on the U.S. Billboard Hot Country Songs for the week of March 24, 2007.

Year-end charts

Certifications

References

2007 singles
2006 songs
Rodney Atkins songs
Songs written by Rivers Rutherford
Songs written by Dave Berg (songwriter)
Curb Records singles